The Linden Public Schools are a comprehensive community public school district that serves students in pre-kindergarten through twelfth grade from Linden, in Union County, New Jersey, United States.

As of the 2020–21 school year, the district, comprised of 11 schools, had an enrollment of 6,159 students and 555.0 classroom teachers (on an FTE basis), for a student–teacher ratio of 11.1:1.

The district is classified by the New Jersey Department of Education as being in District Factor Group "B", the seventh-highest of eight groupings. District Factor Groups organize districts statewide to allow comparison by common socioeconomic characteristics of the local districts. From lowest socioeconomic status to highest, the categories are A, B, CD, DE, FG, GH, I and J.

Awards and recognition
School No. 5 was one of nine schools in New Jersey honored in 2020 by the National Blue Ribbon Schools Program, which recognizes high student achievement.

The district was selected as one of the top "100 Best Communities for Higher Music Education in America" in 2006, 2015 and 2016 by the American Music Conference.

Schools
Schools in the district (with 2020–21 enrollment data from the National Center for Education Statistics) are:
Elementary schools
School No. 1 (with 420 students; in grades PreK–5)
Michael Walters, Acting Principal
School No. 2 (593; PreK-5)
Peter Fingerlin, Principal
School No. 4 (425; PreK-5)
Suzanne Olivero, Principal
School No. 5 (275; PreK-5)
Laura Scamardella, Principal
School No. 6 (324; PreK-5)
William Mastriano, Principal
School No. 8 (341; PreK-5)
Michelle Rodriguez, Principal
School No. 9 (327; PreK-5)
Larry Plummer, Principal
School No. 10 (243; PreK-5)
David Walker, Principal
Middle schools
Myles J. McManus Middle School (693; 6-8)
Atiya Y. Perkins, Principal
Joseph E. Soehl Middle School (685; 6-8)
Gwendolyn Long, Principal
High school
Linden High School (1,729; 9–12)
Yelena Horre, Principal

Administration
Core members of the district's administration are:
Dr. Marnie Hazelton, Superintendent
Kathleen A. Gaylord, Business Administrator

Board of education
The district's board of education, comprised of nine members, sets policy and oversees the fiscal and educational operation of the district through its administration. As a Type II school district, the board's trustees are elected directly by voters to serve three-year terms of office on a staggered basis, with three seats up for election each year held (since 2012) as part of the November general election. The board appoints a superintendent to oversee the day-to-day operation of the district.

References

External links
Linden Public Schools

Data for the Linden Public Schools, National Center for Education Statistics

Linden, New Jersey
New Jersey District Factor Group CD
School districts in Union County, New Jersey